Christine Lamson White (May 4, 1926 – April 14, 2013) was an American actress, most noted for her role in "Nightmare at 20,000 Feet", a 1963 episode of the anthology television series The Twilight Zone.

Early life
White was born in Washington, D.C., one of two children of Lucia W. and James Andrew White. Following her graduation from high school, Christine attended the University of North Carolina at Chapel Hill, where she majored in English and also began acting in stage productions of the Carolina Playmakers. After obtaining her undergraduate degree in English in Chapel Hill, she returned to Washington, D.C., to study and earn a master's degree in speech and drama at Catholic University.

She also studied at the Actors Studio and eventually moved to New York to further her theatrical career.

Stage
White was active in summer stock theatre, including work at the Cape Cod Playhouse. She was named Most Outstanding Actress at CCP for her portrayal of Millie in Picnic.

In 1956, she replaced Shelley Winters in the Broadway production of A Hatful of Rain after Winters broke her ankle.

Television
By the 1950s, White had left her home in New York City and relocated to Los Angeles, where she began to appear in television shows. Her first role was in 1952 in the series The Web, and she also starred in the horror film Macabre (1958), directed by William Castle.

Over the course of her 24-year career, she performed in over 50 television series, including Bonanza, Have Gun – Will Travel, The Rifleman, The Loretta Young Show, The Untouchables, Father Knows Best, The Fugitive, and in three episodes of Perry Mason: "The Case of the Blushing Pearls", "The Case of the Curious Bride", and "The Case of the Demure Defendant".

In 1961, White was cast as Kitty in The Twilight Zone episode "Prime Mover", and later that same year she began performing as a regular character, Abigail Adams, in the situation comedy Ichabod and Me, which CBS broadcast for only one season. In 1963, White returned to work again on The Twilight Zone in the series' iconic episode "Nightmare at 20,000 Feet". Serving as the main supporting character in that episode, she portrays Julia Wilson, the wife of a terrified airplane passenger played by William Shatner.

Author Gore Vidal noted in his memoir Palimpsest that White, "almost invariably got the (television) parts that my friend Joanne Woodward wanted." He continued, "When Joanne received the Academy Award (1957 - The Three Faces of Eve), I wired her, 'Where is Chris White tonight?'"

Film
White's acting was not limited to the stage and television series, as she also appeared in various feature films. Among these was a co-starring role in Man Crazy, produced and released by Security Pictures in 1953 and, in a smaller role, portraying the wife of a motorcycle cop in the 1973 "Dirty Harry" film Magnum Force.

Personal life
White reportedly had "a brief love affair" with actor James Dean.Later in life, she was an active part of the Evangelical Christian community.

Death
White died on April 14, 2013, at a nursing home in Washington D.C. Her survivors included a number of nieces and nephews.

Selected filmography

References

External links
 
 

1926 births
2013 deaths
American actresses
Actresses from Washington, D.C.
University of North Carolina at Chapel Hill alumni
21st-century American women